Euphorbia boinensis is a species of plant in the family Euphorbiaceae. It is endemic to Madagascar.  Its natural habitat is subtropical or tropical dry forests. It is threatened by habitat loss.

References

boinensis
Endemic flora of Madagascar
Critically endangered flora of Africa
Taxonomy articles created by Polbot